Duncan James (born 1978) is a British singer and member of the band Blue.

Duncan James may also refer to:
Duncan James (Australian singer) (fl. 2003–04), Australian singer
Duncan Airlie James (born 1961), kickboxer

See also

James Duncan (disambiguation)